The Oberliga ("Upper League"; plural: Oberligen) is the fifth tier of the German football league system. Before the introduction of the 3. Liga in 2008, it was the fourth tier.  At the end of the 2011–12 season the number of Oberligas was increased from eleven to fourteen.

With the exception of the Nazi-era Gauliga, the term Oberliga (equivalent to Premier League in English) was used prior to the formation of the Bundesliga in 1963 for first-division leagues in Germany.  Between 1978–94 the term Amateuroberliga was used for third-tier leagues, which were then the highest level of amateur play in the country. The current usage of the designation Oberliga was introduced in 1994. In East Germany a separate league structure was in place from 1948–1990 and the top flight division there was known as the DDR-Oberliga.

Pre-Bundesliga Oberligen

From the end of the Second World War until the formation of the Bundesliga in 1963 there were five regional Oberligen:
Oberliga Berlin
Oberliga Nord
Oberliga West
Oberliga Südwest
Oberliga Süd

Based on criteria outlined by the German association in October 1962 an evaluation system covering the last 12 seasons was established through which the sixteen clubs from these five leagues were established which were to form the new nationwide first division Bundesliga, with the others going to the new second tier Regionalligen.

Champions of Pre-Bundesliga Oberligen

2. Oberliga
Below the Oberliga the 2. Oberliga existed from 1949 to 1963 as the second tier in West Germany, except in Northern Germany and West Berlin where this level was never introduced. The 2. Oberligas were:
 2. Oberliga Süd
 2. Oberliga Südwest
 2. Oberliga West

Overview
Oberliga champions are usually promoted to Regionalliga which is directly below the 3. Liga. The Oberliga Nordost has two divisions ("Süd" and "Nord").

If the champion of an Oberliga is the B-team of a club which already has a team in the Regionalliga, or which has a team which will be relegated to the Regionalliga, the B-team cannot be promoted, and the next highest qualified team will be promoted instead.

There are fourteen "Oberligen", based on states and regions of Germany.

Promotion from the Oberligas to the 2nd Bundesliga
From 1974 to 1994, the Oberligas, originally called 1st Amateurliga, were set right below the two 2nd Bundesligas, North and South.  Originally there was 15 Amateurligas which were reduced to 8 Oberligas in 1978.  From 1981 the 2nd Bundesliga was reduced to one single league.  Because there always were more Oberliga champions then promotion spots, these clubs had to determine the promoted teams by the way of a promotion play-off to the 2. Bundesliga, called "Aufstiegsrunde zur 2. Bundesliga".

Short history of the Oberligas
Since 2012–13 fourteen leagues exist on Oberliga level, increased from eleven the previous season:

Oberliga Baden-Württemberg 
The Oberliga Baden-Württemberg was formed in 1978 to provide a single-division 3rd tier league for the state of Baden-Württemberg. Previously, the clubs in the state had played in four separate Amateurligas; Nordwürttemberg, Schwarzwald-Bodensee, Nordbaden and Südbaden. Two of those were merged, the Amateurligas Nordwürttemberg and Schwarzwald-Bodensee to form the Verbandsliga Württemberg.

Feeder leagues to the Oberliga Baden-Württemberg 
 Verbandsliga Nordbaden
 Verbandsliga Südbaden
 Verbandsliga Württemberg

Bayernliga 
The Bayernliga was formed in 1945. In 1946–47, 1947–48 and from 1953–54 till 1962–63 it was split in a northern and a southern division. From 1963 to 2012 it played in the single division format. Since 2012 it again plays with a northern and a southern division.

Feeder leagues to the Bayernliga
 Landesliga Bayern-Nordost
 Landesliga Bayern-Nordwest
 Landesliga Bayern-Mitte
 Landesliga Bayern-Südost
 Landesliga Bayern-Südwest

Bremen-Liga 
The Bremen-Liga was established in 2008.

Feeder league to the Bremen-Liga
 Landesliga Bremen

Oberliga Hamburg 
The Oberliga Hamburg was established in 2008.

Feeder leagues to the Oberliga Hamburg
 Landesliga Hamburg-Hammonia
 Landesliga Hamburg-Hansa

Hessenliga 
The Hessenliga was formed in 1945. In its first two seasons, 1945/46 and 1946/47 it played in two separate divisions, east and west. Since then it has been a single league and is the oldest Oberliga to operate continuously in this format.

Feeder leagues to the Hessenliga
 Verbandsliga Hessen-Nord
 Verbandsliga Hessen-Mitte
 Verbandsliga Hessen-Süd

Oberliga Mittelrhein 
The Oberliga Mittelrhein was elevated to Oberliga status in 2012 after the disbanding of the NRW-Liga which it previously had served.

Feeder leagues to the Oberliga Mittelrhein
 Landesliga Mittelrhein Staffel 1
 Landesliga Mittelrhein Staffel 2

Oberliga Niederrhein 
The Oberliga Niederrhein was elevated to Oberliga status in 2012 after the disbanding of the NRW-Liga which it previously had served.

Feeder leagues to the Oberliga Niederrhein
 Landesliga Niederrhein Gruppe 1
 Landesliga Niederrhein Gruppe 2

Oberliga Niedersachsen 
The Oberliga Niedersachsen was established in 2008, initially in two regional divisions, in 2010 reduced to a single division league, and reverted to two divisions in 2020 for one season only.

Feeder leagues to the Oberliga Niedersachsen
 Landesliga Hannover
 Landesliga Weser-Ems
 Landesliga Braunschweig
 Landesliga Lüneburg

NOFV-Oberliga 
The NOFV-Oberliga was established in 1991 after the German reunification. It covers former East Germany and the city of Berlin. Originally having three divisions, in 1994 the NOFV-Oberliga Mitte ceased to continue and its clubs were split between the other two divisions, NOFV-Oberliga Nord and NOFV-Oberliga Süd.

Feeder Leagues to the NOFV-Oberliga
 Berlin-Liga
 Brandenburg-Liga
 Verbandsliga Mecklenburg-Vorpommern
 Landesliga Sachsen
 Verbandsliga Sachsen-Anhalt
 Verbandsliga Thüringen

The participating teams are redistributed between the northern and the southern division based on geographical needs. If possible, teams from Berlin, Brandenburg and Mecklenburg-Vorpommern promote to the northern division, whereas teams from Saxony, Saxony-Anhalt and Thuringia promote to the southern division. In some seasons, the northern and southern divisions cover teams from northern Saxony-Anhalt and southern Brandenburg respectively.

Oberliga Rheinland-Pfalz/Saar 
The Oberliga Rheinland-Pfalz/Saar, named Oberliga Südwest until 2012, was formed in 1978 to provide a single-division third tier league for the two states Saarland and Rheinland-Pfalz. Previously, the clubs that make up this Oberliga played in three separate leagues; the Amateurligas Südwest, Saarland, and Rheinland. The league split into two divisions in 2020 for one season only.

Feeder leagues to the Oberliga Südwest
 Verbandsliga Südwest
 Saarlandliga
 Verbandsliga Rheinland

Oberliga Schleswig-Holstein 
The Oberliga Schleswig-Holstein was established in 2008 as the Schleswig-Holstein-Liga and took its present name in 2017. It also split into two divisions in 2020 for almost one year only.

Feeder leagues to the Schleswig-Holstein-Liga until 2017
 Verbandsliga Schleswig-Holstein-Nord-West
 Verbandsliga Schleswig-Holstein-Nord-Ost
 Verbandsliga Schleswig-Holstein-Süd-West
 Verbandsliga Schleswig-Holstein-Süd-Ost

Feeder leagues to the Oberliga Schleswig-Holstein after 2017
 Landesliga Schleswig
 Landesliga Holstein
 Landesliga Mitte (since 2020)

Oberliga Westfalen 
The Oberliga Westfalen was formed in 1978 to provide a single-division for the Westphalia region. It was disestablished in 2008 with the introduction of the NRW-Liga but reestablished in 2012.

Feeder leagues to the Oberliga Westfalen
 Westfalenliga Staffel 1
 Westfalenliga Staffel 2

Defunct Oberligas

The Amateur-Oberliga Berlin was established in 1974 to accommodate the majority of clubs of the Regionalliga Berlin when this league ceased to exist. With the German reunification in 1991 the Oberliga Berlin ceased to exist and its clubs were spread between the NOFV-Oberliga Nord and the NOFV-Oberliga Mitte. The highest level of league play in Berlin is now the Berlin-Liga.

The NOFV-Oberliga Mitte existed from the German reunification in 1991 until its dissolution in 1994. Its clubs were moved to either the NOFV-Oberliga Nord or the NOFV-Oberliga Süd.

The Oberliga Niedersachsen/Bremen existed from 1994 till 2004 as a replacement for the Oberliga Nord. With the reestablishment of the Oberliga Nord, the Oberliga Niedersachsen/Bremen ceased to exist.

The Oberliga Hamburg/Schleswig-Holstein existed from 1994 till 2004 as a replacement for the Oberliga Nord. With the reestablishment of the Oberliga Nord, the Oberliga Hamburg/Schleswig-Holstein ceased to exist.

The Oberliga Nordrhein was established in 1978 as a new joint amateur top flight for the best teams of the Verbandsliga Niederrhein and the Verbandsliga Mittelrhein. It was replaced by the NRW-Liga in 2008, which is a merger of the Oberliga Nordrhein and the Oberliga Westfalen.

The NRW-Liga was formed in 2008 and disbanded again in 2012 and replaced by the Oberliga Westfalen, the Oberliga Mittelrhein and the Oberliga Niederrhein.

The Oberliga Nord was formed in 1974 to form a highest playing level for the states of Niedersachsen, Schleswig-Holstein, Hamburg and Bremen. As such it was a continuation of the old Regionalliga Nord which was superseded by the 2. Bundesliga Nord in 1974. It stopped operating in 1994 when the Regionalliga Nord was reformed, now as the third tier of the German football league system. It was replaced by the Oberliga Hamburg/Schleswig-Holstein and the Oberliga Niedersachsen/Bremen. In 2004 the Oberliga Nord was re-established to replace these two leagues. To add to the confusion, the Oberliga Nord again ceased to exist after the 2007–08 season with the establishment of the 3. Liga.

Oberliga Timeline

Source:

References

Sources
 Die Bayernliga 1945 – 1997,  published by the DSFS, 1998
 Deutschlands Fußball in Zahlen,  An annual publication with tables and results from the Bundesliga to Verbandsliga/Landesliga, publisher: DSFS
 Kicker Almanach,  The yearbook on German football from Bundesliga to Oberliga, since 1937, published by the Kicker Sports Magazine
 Süddeutschlands Fussballgeschichte in Tabellenform 1897–1988  History of Southern German football in tables, publisher & author: Ludolf Hyll
 Die Deutsche Liga-Chronik 1945–2005  History of German football from 1945 to 2005 in tables, publisher: DSFS, published: 2006

External links 
 Das deutsche Fußball Archiv Historic German league tables 
 Weltfussball.de Round-by-round results and tables of the Oberligas from 1994 onwards 

 

 
5
Ger